Norkino (Nörkä) is a rural locality (a village) and the administrative centre of Norkinsky Selsoviet, Baltachevsky District, Bashkortostan, Russia. The population was 406 as of 2010. There are 9 streets.

Geography 
Norkino is located 14 km southwest of Starobaltachevo (the district's administrative centre) by road. Usmanovo is the nearest rural locality.

References 

Rural localities in Baltachevsky District